The Escudo hummingbird (Amazilia tzacatl handleyi) is a hummingbird in the subfamily Trochilinae. It was long considered a doubtfully distinct species, but more recently it is generally treated as a subspecies of the rufous-tailed hummingbird, A. tzacatl.

It is endemic to Isla Escudo de Veraguas in Panama. Except for its larger size, it is similar to the rufous-tailed hummingbird. Its natural habitat is tropical moist shrubland and woodland. With a total range estimated at only 3 km2, it is potentially threatened by habitat loss or invasive species.

When it was still considered a good species, it was classified as Vulnerable species by the IUCN, noting that any evidence of a declining population could lead to an uplisting to Critically Endangered status. In 2008, it was removed from the IUCN Red List however, as only species are included therein.

Footnotes

References
 
  (2008a) Escudo Hummingbird Species Factsheet. Retrieved 2008-MAY-26.
  (2008b): [2008 IUCN Redlist status changes]. Retrieved 2008-MAY-23.

Escudo hummingbird
Birds of Panama
Escudo hummingbird
Taxa named by Alexander Wetmore
Taxonomy articles created by Polbot